Airflight Limited was a British charter, and cargo airline from 1948 to 1950.

History 

The airline was formed by former Air Vice-Marshal Don Bennett at Langley Airfield, Berkshire, to operate in the Berlin Airlift with two long-fuselage Avro Tudor aircraft. These were flown by Bennett and a single other pilot, WWII RAF veteran Stanley Sickelmore, Bennett having the only night flight licence made all the nighttime trips himself with Sickelmore as co-pilot.

One of the Tudor aircraft had operated 85 sorties carrying over 9 tons of supplies per flight between Wunsdorf and Gatow.

At the end of the Berlin Airlift the aircraft were used for trooping charters to the Canal Zone for the British government and ad hoc charters. One of the charters was to end in disaster when G-AKBY was used for a rugby charter and crashed on approach to RAF Llandow in Wales on 12 March 1950. The month after the disaster the company merged into one of Bennett's other companies Fairflight Limited on 28 April 1950.

In 1951, Bennett sold Airflight on to Air Charter, a small company operating out of Luton under Freddie Laker.

Airflight Ltd was dissolved in 1965 and Fairflight was formally wound up in 1966.

Aircraft operated 
 Avro Tudor 2 G-AGRY
 Avro Tudor 5 G-AKBY

Accidents and incidents
 12 March 1950 - Avro Tudor G-AKBY while operating a rugby charter, crashed on approach to RAF Llandow in Wales with 80 fatalities.

See also
 List of defunct airlines of the United Kingdom

Notes

References 
 
 
Maynard, John Bennett and the Pathfinders Arms and Armour London 1996

External links

Defunct airlines of the United Kingdom
Airlines established in 1948
Airlines disestablished in 1950